The  is a kofun burial mound located in what is now part of the town of Wakasa, Fukui in the Hokuriku region of Japan. The site was designated a National Historic Site of Japan in 1935.

Overview
The Nakatsuka Kofun is one of a group of seven kofun located in the Wakibukuro neighborhood of central Wakasa, forming the Jōnozuka Kofun Cluster. It is west of the tracks of the JR West Obama Line railway and near a hill called  (Zenbuyama, 膳部山). The Nakatsuka Kofun is in relatively poor preservation, as much has been destroyed over the centuries by agricultural activity and as a source of soil. The tumulus has a two-tier structure with fukiishi, orientated north-south, with the posterior circular portion on the northern end. The total length is 72 meters and the circular portion has a diameter of 46 meters and height of six meters, and the anterior rectangular portion has a width of 26 meters. Some fragments of cylindrical haniwa have been found in the vicinity; however, the structure of the tumulus has never been properly archaeological excavation excavated by archaeologists and the inner structure is unknown; however, a ground-penetrating radar survey in 2008 indicated the presence of a passage grave burial chamber similar to that of the Jōnozuka Kofun. Traces of a shield-shaped moat have also been found. 

The tumulus dates from the late 5th century to early 6th century AD. The name of the person interred is unknown; however from the name of the nearby hill (Zenbuyama, 膳部山), it mostly likely corresponds to the grave of a head of the Kashiwade clan (膳氏), who are recorded in the Kojiki and Nihon Shoki as having served as Kuni no miyatsuko of Wakasa Province since the time of the legendary Emperor Kōgen. 

The tumulus is about 30 minutes on foot from Kaminaka Station on the JR West Obama Line.

See also
List of Historic Sites of Japan (Fukui)

References

External links

 Obama city home page 
Cultural Heritage of Fukui Prefecture 

Kofun
History of Fukui Prefecture
Wakasa, Fukui
Historic Sites of Japan
Wakasa Province